Diadelia truncata is a species of beetle in the family Cerambycidae. It was described by Per Olof Christopher Aurivillius in 1915.

References

Diadelia
Beetles described in 1915